The Adelaide University Liberal Club (AULC) is a student group operating under the auspices of the Adelaide University Union (AUU). The club hosts policy debates, annual dinners, student election campaigns, and guest speaker events with members of parliament. It is an affiliate of the Australian Liberal Students' Federation. South Australian senator Simon Birmingham was once president of the club.

See also

Australian Liberal Students' Federation
Sydney University Liberal Club
University of Tasmania Liberal Club

References

Student politics in Australia